This is a list of notable telegraphists.

Telegraphists 
 Harold Bride
 Harold  Thomas Cottam
Louisa Margaret Dunkley
 Thomas Eckert
 Thomas Edison
 John H. Emerick
 Mathilde Fibiger
 Ambrose E. Gonzales
 Oliver Heaviside
 Emma Hunter
 Joseph Nathan Kane
 Hiram Percy Maxim
 Mary Macaulay
 Theodore Roosevelt McElroy
 Sir John Moores
 Seeb Chunder Nandy
 Jack Phillips
 Franklin Leonard Pope
 John Willard Raught
 Leah Rosenfeld
 David Sarnoff
 Ola Delight Smith
 Wilhelmina Magdalene Stuart
 Ella Cheever Thayer
 Ella Stewart Udall
 Alfred Vail

See also 

 Lists of people by occupation